The Axis order of battle at Stalingrad is a list of the significant land units that fought in the Battle of Stalingrad on the side of the Axis Powers between September 1942 and February 1943.

Apart from the twenty divisions of the German Wehrmacht, eighteen Romanian divisions took part in the battle on the Axis side as well.

Order of battle

Generaloberst Friedrich Paulus, commanding the 6th ArmyChief of Staff: Generalmajor Arthur Schmidt

German
 6th Army 
  IV Army Corps – General der Pioniere Erwin Jaenecke, from 17 January General der Artillerie Max Pfeffer
  29th Motorized Infantry Division – Generalmajor Hans-Georg Leyser
  297th Infantry Division – General der Artillerie Max Pfeffer, from 16 January Generalmajor Moritz von Drebber
  371st Infantry Division – Generalleutnant Richard Stempel
  VIII Army Corps – General der Artillerie Walter Heitz (promoted January 1943 to Generaloberst)
  76th Infantry Division – Generalleutnant Carl Rodenburg
  113th Infantry Division – Generalleutnant Hans-Heinrich Sixt von Armin
  XI Army Corps – General der Infanterie Karl Strecker
  44th Infantry Division – Generalleutnant Heinrich-Anton Deboi
  376th Infantry Division – Generalleutnant Alexander Edler von Daniels
  384th Infantry Division – Generalleutnant Eccard Freiherr von Gablenz, from 16 January Generalmajor Hans Dörr
 XIV Panzer Corps – General der Panzertruppe Hans-Valentin Hube, from 17 January Generalleutnant Helmuth Schlömer
  3rd Motorized Infantry Division – Generalmajor Helmuth Schlömer, from 18 January Oberst Jobst Freiherr von Hanstein
  60th Motorized Infantry Division – Generalmajor Hans-Adolf von Arenstorff
  16th Panzer Division – Generalleutnant Günther Angern
 LI Army Corps – General der Artillerie Walther von Seydlitz-Kurzbach
  71st Infantry Division – Generalleutnant Alexander von Hartmann, from 25 January Generalmajor Fritz Roske
  79th Infantry Division – Generalleutnant Richard Graf von Schwerin
  94th Infantry Division – Generalleutnant Georg Pfeiffer
  100th Jäger Division – Generalleutnant Werner Sanne
  295th Infantry Division – Generalmajor Otto Korfes
  305th Infantry Division – Generalleutnant Bernhard Steinmetz
  389th Infantry Division – Generalmajor Erich Magnus, from 19 January Generalmajor Martin Lattmann
  14th Panzer Division – Generalmajor Martin Lattmann
  24th Panzer Division – Generalleutnant Arno von Lenski
  Luftwaffe
 9th Flak Division – Generalmajor Wolfgang Pickert
  Jagdgeschwader 3 – Wolf-Dietrich Wilcke
4th Panzer Army
 XXXXVIII Panzer Corps – General der Panzertruppe Rudolf Veiel until November 1942, followed by many other commanders
  14th Panzer Division, transferred to the 6th Army
  29th Motorized Infantry Division, transferred to the 6th Army
  24th Panzer Division, transferred to the 6th Army
  IV Army Corps - General der Infanterie Viktor von Schwedler
  94th Infantry Division, transferred to the 6th Army
  371st Infantry Division, transferred to the 6th Army
  297th Infantry Division, transferred to the 6th Army
 Romanian 6th Corps - Lieutenant General Corneliu Dragalina, transferred to the Romanian 4th Army

Romanian
Army Group Antonescu
 Third Army – General Petre Dumitrescu
 1st Corps – Lieutenant General 
 7th Infantry Division – Brigadier General 
 11th Infantry Division – Brigadier General  (POW)
 2nd Corps – Lieutenant General Nicolae Dăscălescu
 9th Infantry Division – Major General 
 14th Infantry Division – Major General 
 7th Cavalry Division – Colonel Gheorghe Munteanu
 4th Corps – Lieutenant General Constantin Sănătescu
 1st Cavalry Division – Colonel Constantin Brătescu
 13th Infantry Division – Major General Gheorghe Ionescu
 15th Infantry Division – Brigadier General Ioan Sion (KIA)
 5th Corps – Lieutenant General 
 5th Infantry Division – Major General  (POW) 
 6th Infantry Division – Major General Mihail Lascăr (POW)
 In reserve
 1st Armoured Division – Major General Gheorghe Radu
 Various artillery regiments
Fourth Army – Lieutenant General Constantin Constantinescu-Claps
 6th Corps – Lieutenant General Corneliu Dragalina
 1st Infantry Division – Brigadier General 
 2nd Infantry Division – Brigadier General  Dumitru Tudose
 18th Infantry Division – Brigadier General Radu Băldescu
 20th Infantry Division – Major General Nicolae Tătăranu until 19 January 1943, then Brigadier General  (POW)
 7th Corps – Lieutenant General 
 4th Infantry Division – Brigadier General Barbu Alinescu
 5th Cavalry Division – Colonel Dumitru Popescu
 8th Cavalry Division – Colonel Radu Korne

See also
 Romanian armies in the Battle of Stalingrad

References

External links
 Lexikon der Wehrmacht 
 Commanders at the Battle of Stalingrad 
 
 Map of Stalingrad – 12 December 1942
 

World War II orders of battle
Battle of Stalingrad
German units at the Battle of Stalingrad